Šipek is a small settlement on the right bank of the Lahinja River east of Dragatuš in the Municipality of Črnomelj in the White Carniola area of southeastern Slovenia. The area is part of the traditional region of Lower Carniola and is now included in the Southeast Slovenia Statistical Region.

References

External links
Šipek on Geopedia

Populated places in the Municipality of Črnomelj